Ghoul Shabak is a village in Al Jamimah District of the Hajjah Governorate, Yemen.
and according to the 2004 Census, the village has a population of 55 residents.

References

Populated places in Hajjah Governorate